The Rubyz is the debut album by the American Christian teen pop girl group, The Rubyz. The album was released on April 1, 2008, and tracks from the album, including "Outrageous," were featured on Radio Disney.  Additionally, the album peaked at No. 26 on the Christian Albums chart published by Billboard.

Track listing

Music videos
"Thirteen"

Personnel
Alexis Slifer - vocals
Cammie Hall - vocals
Marissa Milele - vocals

References

External links
Official Site
Jesus Freak Hideout
Radio Disney

2008 debut albums
The Rubyz albums